Karvandarina is a genus of flowering plants in the family Asteraceae.

Species
There is only one known species,  Karvandarina aphylla, native to Pakistan and Iran.

It is an erect, 60-70 cm tall, woody herb. Stem much branched, basally whitish villous, green-glabrous above. Leaves linear-lanceolate, 10-20 cm long, 4-7 mm wide, fragile, glabrous, pale to green, sinuate-serrate, tooth prolonged into 1-3 mm long spinules. Capitula solitary, terminal. Flowers pink. Distribution: Turbat, Balochistan, Pakistan.

References

Cynareae
Monotypic Asteraceae genera
Flora of Iran